Foel-goch is a mountain in Snowdonia, north-west Wales, and forms part of the Glyderau range, in Gwynedd. It lies in between Y Garn and Mynydd Perfedd.

Good views of Dyffryn Ogwen are seen with Pen yr Ole Wen, Carnedd Dafydd, Tryfan, Glyder Fawr and Elidir Fawr close by.

References

Llanberis
Mountains and hills of Gwynedd
Mountains and hills of Snowdonia
Hewitts of Wales
Nuttalls